Edgewater Towers is a high rise apartment block located in the suburb of St Kilda in Melbourne, Australia. The building, completed in 1961, was Melbourne's first, high rise residential apartment block and the tallest in Victoria until Domain Park Flats was completed in 1962. The building was designed by émigré architect Mordechai Benshemesh who designed many multi-storey buildings in St Kilda and Elwood. Edgewater Towers is considered to be Benshemesh's most iconic design.
Edgewater Towers stands at 44 m tall (architectural), 39 m tall (to the roof), and 13 storeys tall.

History 

Edgewater Towers was the brainchild of property developer Bruce Small, of Malvern Star Bicycles fame, and later Mayor for Gold Coast, Queensland. "He retired as chairman and managing director of Bruce Small Industries in 1958, selling out his interests in the big Melbourne-based retail chain, then chalked up a real-estate triumph with a series of sell-out auctions and built Edgewater Towers, Melbourne's first multi-storey home-unit project". The project was conceived as "own your own" luxury housing and marketed as "sophisticated living with beautiful views". It was designed in 1959–60 and constructed in 1960–61. The project ran into financial difficulties and construction stopped after the lower floors were completed. It was sold for £500,000 and construction then resumed. A restaurant and lounge bar, which had been planned for the roof, did not eventuate. Edgewater Towers was opened on 4 March 1961 by Sir Horace Petty, the Minister for Housing (Victoria) and Immigration, who was an advocate for high density housing. The building is included in the City of Port Phillip's Heritage Review, which lists its significance as being "the first of St Kilda's residential high rise developments". The review also states "It still plays an important symbolic role in the perception of St Kilda's character and imagery". "Standing somewhat like a towering section of a stranded ocean liner, it announces St Kilda's uniquely nautical cosmopolitan zone at its southern approaches". "Thirteen storeys high, with great views across the bay, Edgewater Towers was a confident expression of progress and, after a period of neglect, has re-emerged as an iconic expression of Melbourne post-war modernism".

Fire life safety 
The changing fire life safety requirements for high rise flats caused Edgewater Towers to be treated as a test case for fire life safety and Edgewater Towers was required to install an improved fire life safety system by the Port Phillip Council in the late 1980s. The Port Phillip Council required Edgewater Towers to have a further fire life safety upgrade in 2002 and was subsequently fitted with a fire sprinkler protection system and fully addressable automatic fire detection and alarm system between 2005 and 2008, and certified complete 2014. The earlier fire life safety upgrade between 1989 and 1995 included fire hose reels, a smoke and heat detection system, enclosure of the previously open West stairwell, sealing of floor penetrations, closure of the mail chute, emergency and exit lighting, removal of glazed timber doors in the corridors, modifications to both stairs to discharge directly to outdoors, fire rated doors, fire rated enclosed balcony ends and blocking up corridor clerestory glazing to each flat to achieve the necessary 1-hour fire-resistance rating. The sprinkler fire protection system was activated in August 2013, when a fire started on a balcony on the 11th. floor. The Age newspaper carried the story. Edgewater Towers has an Essential Safety Measures, Certificate of Final Inspection dated 14 July 2014 displayed in the lobby.

Concrete remediation 
As an early high rise concrete building in a marine environment, Edgewater Towers suffered concrete degradation in the 75 mm thin balcony upstands, where the steel reinforcement bars were not provided with adequate protective concrete cover which require periodic repairs. The building had concrete remediation in 1995 followed by repainting. The most recent concrete remediation was completed in 2011 and then repainted white. Edgewater Towers has always been painted white, though the original sales brochure shows it differently. Whilst the structural integrity of the building was not affected, the façade of the building was disfigured by the gaps where concrete had spalled from various balconies. The most recent concrete remediation was managed by Aurecon.

Building interiors 
The doors were removed in a fire life safety upgrade except the original 12AB Penthouse apartment which remains. The wide corridors were originally painted bright reds, oranges and yellow, and the lobby bright green. Ends of the corridors were originally patterned wall paper. The original carpet was black and white with purple flecks. The early residents apparently disliked the bright 1960s colours and they were repainted in neutral tones as today. The corridors were originally lit using borrowed daylight from clerestory windows to each flat. At nighttime the corridors were lit with fluorescent tube fittings at right angle to the corridor which is unconventional and these have been replaced with energy efficient light-emitting diode (LED) fittings in the same unconventional arrangement in 2013. Originally each flat was fitted with a decorative screen door of wrought iron scrolls and these were replaced with security screen doors when each flat was fitted with a fire rated door in the 90s fire life safety upgrade. Originally Edgewater Towers' residents had use of two common area laundries on each floor (24 total), each fitted with automatic washing machine, clothes dryer, sink, drying cupboard, instantaneous hot water heater and incinerator chute. Currently there are 6 working laundries and the remaining 18 converted to bike storage (55 bikes). One of the original two incinerator chutes remains in use as the garbage disposal chute. Edgewater Towers has had an interior renovation 2010–14.

Flats 
A, B, G and H flats are two bedroom, two balcony (approx. 82.7 m2; C and F flats are one bedroom, three balcony (approx. 60.3 m2); D and E flats are one bedroom, two balcony (approx. 56.7 m2). The 12AB Penthouse was a pair of two bedroom flats with a layout of three bedrooms, two bathrooms, kitchen, dining, living room and wet bar. Original Edgewater Towers' flat prices ranged from AU£5,625 (one bedroom ground floor) up to AU£8,830 (two bedroom twelfth floor). The original quarterly service charge was AU£19/10/-. It took over two years after opening to complete sales of the flats. Each flat included "entry hall", "king-size lounge rooms", "large bedrooms", "kitchens with ever-changing panoramic views" and "comfortable dinettes". "You're whisked to your soundproof flat in automatic express lifts" (two independent lifts). The original architect's ground floor plan drawing notes Lounge flooring as 'parquetry' and bedroom flooring as 'cork tile' though they were never installed and all flats were grey carpet. Ceilings are acoustically treated with "sound-deadening Vermiculite". Clerestory glazing above each internal doorway and the bathroom for borrowed daylight. Bathrooms were originally grey or grey/pink ceramic tiles and kitchens cream vinyl tile. Enclosure of open balconies started in the 1960s. Each balcony enclosure had a unique design until standard designs were adopted in 1995. A City of Port Phillip Planning permit and Edgewater Service Ltd Board approval is required. Owners are individually responsible for the maintenance and replacement of balcony enclosures.

Description 
The "L" shaped site area is 3,329 m2 with 27 m frontage to Marine Parade and 40 m to Spenser Street. Overall building dimensions of 46 x 13 x 44 m high.

The building originally contained 100 flats with shops, a restaurant and offices on the ground floor. Each floor contained four one bedroom and four two bedroom flats. The ground floor restaurant "The Reef" (which had a nautical theme with fishing nets and other nautical paraphernalia) and later a milk bar with counter and café seating, until the early 80s was converted to a three bedroom flat in the mid-1980s. A Kiosk planned for the lobby was never operated as one and was converted for bike storage (24 bikes) in the mid-1990s. The lobby is elevated to capture the bay and park views and features cantilevered roof canopies above both entrances, clerestory windows above a curved wall of Castlemaine slate, terrazzo flooring and columns of blue and pink mosaic glass tiles.

Copper mail boxes are original (Originally external, relocated inside shortly after Edgewater opened and integrated into the recycled timber screen in 2012). Many original features of the building such as the curved privacy screen before the two public restroom doors, resident directory board (black felt with white plastic letters), rockery planter with green plastic curtain/screen, open West stairwell, corridor clerestory glazing for borrowed daylight and mail chute were removed or closed off during fire life safety upgrades. The original very heavy swinging glass and timber entrance doors were replaced with aluminium framed glazing and automatic sliding doors in 2014.

The original architect's ground floor plan drawing notes entrance doors as 'Aluminium Frame' though they were never installed. When opened Edgewater Towers was fitted with two waste incinerators as there was no managed garbage truck collection in place at the time. The incinerators were removed in a fire life safety upgrade and are now stairwell fire exit paths direct to outside.

Facing Marine Parade, the building originally had a large illuminated fluorescent white plastic sign "Edgewater Towers" in red gothic script (Blackletter) until it was brought down by a storm in 1988. The original rooftop lift motor rooms were fitted with louvres and these were replaced with steel framed glazing in 1986. There is parking on grade for 95 cars at the east end of the building including 12 undercover car ports; the maximum covered area allowed to maintain the required minimum 28 m2 of open space per flat. The original plans for the building were lost when fire gutted the St Kilda Town Hall and partial plans are stored in the State Library of Victoria.

Construction, management and title 
The structure is of a cast in place reinforced concrete flat slab 150 mm thick construction founded on Franki piles to a depth of approximately 9 m. The building contractor was "proud to have secured this large contract, and their whole organisation are keen to add this building to their already impressive record of achievements in multi-storey structures". The building contractor required "the importation of the most modern climbing crane in Australia currently being used on the Edgewater Towers project". The crane was a Liebherr type manufactured partly in Germany and partly in Ireland.

Edgewater Towers is Strata Title. Edgewater Towers was built before the Strata Title Act (1967) and was originally Stratum Title with a 'Certificate of Title' to each flat. This is different to Company Share Title. The owner (or Body Corporate vehicle) was Edgewater Service Ltd (ESL), (ABN 66 004 514 596). The ESL Board of Directors (voluntary and unpaid positions) administered the building, regulated by Australian Securities & Investments Commission (ASIC). Following an EGM in late 2019 it was resolved to convert to the more common Owners Corporation which completed June 2020 and Edgewater Towers is now Strata Title, regulated by Victorian Civil and Administrative Tribunal (VCAT).

Gardens
Edgewater Towers originally had a garden open to Marine Parade which included very limited planting, extensive pebble and decorative concrete screen block walls (Besser block). The gardens were reviewed and redesigned to incorporate DDA access by Phil Tulk, Heritage Landscape Consultant and replanted in 2012. No original 60s plantings remain. The front patio, strip and pocket gardens are planted with indigenous species of the St Kilda area including: Allocasuarina littoralis (Black Sheoke), Pomaderris paniculosa ssp. Parilia (Shining Dogwood), Atriplex cinerea (Coast salt bush), Correa alba (White correa), Lasiopetalum baueri (Slender velvet bush), Correa reflexa (Native fuchsia), Leucophyta brownii (Pincushion bush), Dianella brevicaulis (Small flower flax lily), Goodenia ovata prostrate form (Hop Goodenia) and a Banksia integrifolia (Coastal Banksia). Additional indigenous plantings in 2022 including: Myoporum insulare (Common boobialla, native juniper), Carpobrotus rossii (Karkalla, pig face, sea fig, beach bananas), Dodonaea viscosa (Hop bush) and Olearia lanuginosa (Daisy bush). The Willow Myrtle 'Agonis' was planted in the 1970s by longtime resident building manager (1969–1988 Approx.) Johannes (Jonas) LeFerink. The 'Avenue' of deciduous trees to the South is Ulmus parvifolia 'Burnley Select' (non-fruiting Chinese Elm) and the hedge is Raphiolepis Snow Maiden. In 2013 the car park was upgraded and planted with a 'Grove' of Ulmus parvifolia 'Burnley Select' (non-fruiting Chinese Elm) and there is a small herb garden.

Rooftop terrace
"The employment of flat roofs served as a considerable influence in the mid-century developments that populated Melbourne, where the roof became part of the recreational space available to tenants or a replication of the ground plane for the placement of services and other amenities".

Edgewater Towers residents have access to rooftop terrace (building), originally marketed as "ideal for sunbathing or showing the panoramic views to your friends". The original steel rooftop balustrade was replaced with a chain-link one located on the outer perimeter in the 90's concrete remediation and installation of a rooftop building maintenance unit. The defunct building maintenance unit was removed in 2013 and a new compliant galvanized steel balustrade reinstated inboard of the perimeter (similar in appearance and location to original) in 2015. The 1.5mm thick butyl rubber waterproof roof membrane was completed in 2017. The original rooftop had access to the amazing panoramic views but no real amenity with unsightly equipment and piping exposed, possibly due to the original developer running short of money towards the end of the construction.

A modest rooftop upgrade design was granted planning permission by City Port Phillip in February 2016. The rooftop terrace (43m x 9m) was upgraded with equipment screening, fixed tables and bench seating, electric BBQ facilities (4No.) and fixed shade canopy overhangs. An accessible raised concrete paver and adjustable pedestal flooring system eliminated nuisance trip hazards and protects the Butynol rubber waterproof membrane. A Building Surveyor requirement of granting the Construction Permit was to demonstrate the structural adequacy of the existing concrete roof slab. This necessitated a structural load test using a temporary swimming pool filled with a depth of water to simulate the correct structural loading and by measuring the deflection and return of the concrete slab. Following almost a decade of closure to residents, the rooftop terrace was completed in May 2018 and reopened to residents providing a fabulous communal space.

Notable residents 

One Edgewater Towers' resident was cyclist and politician Sir Hubert Opperman and Lady Mavys Opperman. Opperman had the pair of Edgewater Towers flats since 1961 and his main residence was in his electorate of Corio in Geelong until July 1967 when he became the Australian High Commissioner in Malta. Opperman retired from this overseas position in September 1972 and Edgewater Towers became his main residence. In December 1972 when Gough Whitlam led the Labour Party to victory, ending twenty three years of Conservative leadership Opperman quipped to John Menzies that he and Mavys had made their flat ‘fit for retired people to sulk in when they read of Whitlam's wicked political progress’. Both lived at Edgewater Towers until 1985. Other residents include:
 Dora Nolan, the mother of the artist, Sidney Nolan. His sister Lorna Gosling (née Nolan) and brother-in-law also lived at Edgewater and owned and operated the restaurant for a period.
 Dr Bertram Wainer, the anti-corruption campaigner, who successfully campaigned to legalise abortion in Victoria.
 Max Merritt, leader of the group Max Merritt and the Meteors.  
 Sir Gilbert Dyett, veteran of Gallipoli, President of the Returned and Services League of Australia, and secretary of the Victorian Trotting and Racing Association. His name is listed at 12 Marine Parade in the 1963 Sands & McDougal Directory. He may have lived at Edgewater towards the end of his life (died 1964) or he may have rented his flat to ex-serviceman for a low rent as he was doing with other properties in Brighton.
 Brian Dixon, a prominent Australian Rules footballer who played for Melbourne Football Club in five premierships. He went on to represent the state seat of St Kilda as a Liberal, and became a minister in the Hamer Ministry. He was responsible for starting the 1975 "Life. Be in it." program.
Stanley Leighton, founder of Leighton Holdings. Stanley knew Bruce Small and invested in a number of Edgewater flats. The Leighton family resided in the original 12AB Penthouse apartment from the time Edgewater opened which was later sub-divided to two 2 bedroom flats.
 Josef Ganz, editor in chief of Motor-Kritik magazine until 1934. He developed a prototype small people's car at the German car and motorcycle manufacturer, Adler.
 Mario Bulfone, professional wrestler, better known by his ring name Mario Milano.
 Ron Hutchinson (jockey), International Jockey and winner 2,000 Guineas Stakes on Martial in 1960, 1,000 Guineas Stakes on Full Dress and St Leger Stakes on Intermezzo in 1969. Also his son, Peter Hutchinson and 1993 Caulfield Cup winner on Fraar.
 Jim Johnson (jockey), Three times Melbourne Cup winner on Gatum Gatum in 1963 and Rain Lover in 1968 and 1969.
 Anne Scott Pendlebury, television and film actress. Anne played the role of Hilary Robinson in the soap opera Neighbours.
 Nick Morris (basketball) Australian Paralympian. He was a member of the Australian team that won gold at the 1996 Summer Paralympics in Atlanta, for which he received a Medal of the Order of Australia.
 Frederick Hans Halpern, Prisoner of War, artist and writer. Halpern was in Palestine at the outbreak of World War 2 and due to his Austrian origins and suspected involvement with Haganah (later to become the Jewish Defense Force) was interned by the British in Palestine and East Africa for 4 years.
 John and Ian Morrey, International award-winning hair stylists. Ian had a hairdressing salon in a flat on the ground floor in 1963, taking over from brother John who started it in 1962. 

It is an urban myth that radio and television personality Mary Hardy  committed suicide in Edgewater Towers. She lived on Beaconsfield Parade, Middle Park in a smaller brick and white high rise

Heritage recognition 
Heritage Recognition Plaque:
Edgewater Towers was honored with a City of Port Phillip Heritage Recognition Plaque. It was unveiled 23 September 2017 by Councillor David Brand with a short ceremony. A Dutch film crew were present making a documentary film "Ganz – How I Lost My Beetle" directed by Suzanne Raes and filmed by Paul Schilperoord, Author of "The Extraordinary Life of Josef Ganz The Jewish Engineer Behind Hitler's Volkswagen".

Edgewater Towers has been included for its architectural, social and cultural significance. The building is significant in the architectural development of St Kilda and of Melbourne post-WW2; and also for the diverse residents, famous and otherwise, across all areas of life, who have lived there.

Edgewater Towers Heritage Recognition Plaque wording:
Designed by architect Mordechai Benshemesh and built in 1961, Edgewater Towers was Melbourne's first privately developed high rise apartment block. It's multi-storey slab construction and international style promised Melburnian's sophisticated living with a beautiful view.
Noted residents include Josef Ganz, the Jewish automotive engineer who was the originator of the Volkswagen. After fleeing Germany during World War 11, he emigrated to Australia and worked for General Motors Holden.
Sir Hubert 'Oppy' Opperman, renowned cyclist and Politician also lived here for almost 30 years.

Heritage Listed:
In 2019 City Port Phillip proposed to commence the process to amend the Port Phillip Planning Scheme. Edgewater Towers was proposed to be included in a new Heritage Overlay (HO510) and the property identified as a place of individual heritage significance. Edgewater Towers is now heritage listed. Edgewater Towers amendment was gazetted (i.e. approved by the Planning Minister Richard Wynne for heritage listing) on 24 December 2021.

What is significant?
It is a thirteen-story apartment block in the International Style. It is completely stripped of ornamentation and decoration, and is characterised by rectilinear forms and the use of glass with reinforced concrete surfaces painted plain white. The projecting front and side balconies provide a nod to the bayside location, particularly in trying to secure views for the apartments not located at the front.

How is it significant?
Edgewater Towers at 12 Marine Parade, St Kilda is of local historic, architectural and aesthetic significance to the City of Port Phillip.

Why is it significant?
Edgewater Towers is significant as one of the first large scale ‘high rise’ apartment buildings in Port Phillip and Melbourne. It introduced a new concept of luxury ‘own your own’ apartment living that encouraged the building of similar apartment blocks in St Kilda and South Melbourne over the following decades, and forms part of an extraordinary collection of flats in St Kilda that demonstrate the history of flat building in Melbourne during the twentieth century. It was the first high-rise apartment design by Mordechai Benshemesh and is said to have secured his reputation as a leading designer of high-density residential developments in Melbourne. Edgewater Towers is an example of the International Style as applied to multi-level residential buildings. This is demonstrated by its monumental scale, rectilinear forms,  use of plain white concrete surfaces. It has aesthetic significance as a landmark building on the St Kilda foreshore.

"Edgewater Towers Regeneration" project was shortlisted and received a Commendation Award under the Heritage category in the City of Port Phillip Design & Development Awards 2020, as an example of good design, thoughtful development and contribution to the vibrancy of Port Phillip. Heritage Category Commendation Award text: “This project represents the first stages of restoration works to this St Kilda beachfront building. The Owners Corporation and the architects are commended for carefully and thoughtfully working to maintain and protect Edgewater Towers through works to communal areas of the building. The faithful restoration of the ground floor entry and foyer spaces and playful clean up and contemporary additions at roof level are important investments in celebrating the importance of this old foreshore beauty, and harbingers of the benefits that will flow with further works planned for the coming years”.

In the media 
An early image of Edgewater Towers together with floor plans appeared in Property writer Harry Perrot's column for the Herald Sun 5 February 1960.

Edgewater Towers features on the cover of Foundations Magazine: the journal of architecture, engineering and building, Edition No. 5 in 1960. It included a 'Special Report' on Redevelopment and Flat Construction in Melbourne with an interview with the Minister for Housing (Victoria) (the Hon. H.R. Petty M.L.A.) and an article on  "Edgewater Towers" with typical and ground floor architectural plans dated 6 May 1960.

A photo of the architectural model of Edgewater Towers can be seen in The Age Newspaper 4 November 1960.

A full page advertisement and image of Edgewater Towers by Alexandra Advertising for Nichols & Borrow Pty Ltd can be seen in The Age Newspaper, 4 November 1960.

Edgewater Towers' Architect Mordechai Benshemesh once debated the merits of multi-storey flats on radio with other prominent Architects of the time Harry Seidler and Neville Gruzman, and Dick Dusseldorp, founder of Lendlease, the transcript of which was published in Foundations Magazine the month after Edgewater Towers opened.

Edgewater Towers photographed in September 1962 by photographic artist Lyle Fowler is held by State Library Victoria.

Edgewater Towers can not be seen in Stanley Kramer's movie On the Beach (1959 film) set in 1964 Melbourne as it was not constructed when the movie was filmed in 1959.

Edgewater Towers featured in Homicide (Australian TV series) – Episode 9 (1964) ‘The Silent Witness’. "When an attractive young girl is murdered, it doesn't take long for Homicide detectives to identify her killer (Adrian Fox at Edgewater Towers) but they have a tense time gathering sufficient evidence to bring him to trial, aware that before they can complete their case he may kill again".

Edgewater Towers featured in Homicide (Australian TV series) – Episode 24 (1965) 'Ladies Man'. "When con man Hal Dunstan (of Edgewater Towers) gets over-confident, a chance encounter with a prowler in a graveyard triggers off more than he can cope with".

Edgewater Towers appears in the photos of 'St Kilda Life Savers' 1968 and 'Women's Business' 1986 by photographic artist Rennie Ellis.

The St Kilda Marina immediately South of Edgewater Towers was not constructed until 1969. Edgewater Towers appears in the photos of 'St Kilda Marina Lighting' 1969 and 'Mr Hans Tholstrup drives "Tom Thumb" into St Kilda Marina' 1971.

Sir Hubert Opperman was interviewed by journalist Mel Pratt at his office in Edgewater Towers on 4 March 1975 for the Oral History Programme for the National Library of Australia.

Dora Irene Nolan (Mother of Artist Sidney Nolan) was photographed by Maggie Diaz at Edgewater Towers in 1977.

"In the 1987 film 'A Matter of Convenience'..... Beach scenes were filmed opposite 'Edgewater Towers'.....".

Allan Zavod, pianist, composer, jazz musician and occasional conductor whose career has mainly been in America was photographed precariously on the rooftop of Edgewater Towers in 1987. Allan's mother Anne Zavod resided in Edgewater Towers from 1973-2021.

Edgewater Towers was "one of the dozens of images included in '45 Storeys', an exhibition of 45 Melbourne Jewish architects" in 1993.

Edgewater Towers can be seen in the 1996 music video "How to make gravy" by Paul Kelly (Australian musician).

Edgewater Towers featured in 'Abortion, Corruption and Cops: The Bertram Wainer Story' (2005).

Edgewater Towers featured in 'Dangerous Remedy' (2012). "Set in 1969 Melbourne, Dangerous Remedy tells the fascinating story of Dr Bertram Wainer who put his life at risk to expose police corruption in an effort to change the law on abortion".

Edgewater Towers painted by artist Garry Pumfrey is published in the book The Art Of Being Melbourne, "Edgewater Towers becomes much more than an apartment block: it looms over the beachfront like a bleached carapace, twinkling with opportunistic nesting life forms".

Edgewater Towers was invited to "Open" for public access as part of Open House Melbourne 28 July 2012, 27 July 2013, 25 July 2015, 30 July 2016, 29 July 2017, 28 July 2018 and 27 July 2019.

Edgewater Towers is included in the Footpath Guide, Melbourne St Kilda 1850–1960 Architectural Walking Tour.

Edgewater Towers features in the Age newspaper article "St Kilda engineer given credit for Volkswagen".

Edgewater Towers features in the exhibition of post-war Modernist architecture in Melbourne "Excavating Modernism" along with other buildings designed by architect Mordechai Benshemesh, together with works by Ernest Fooks, Kurt Popper and Herbert Tisher. "These architects contributed to the socio-cultural landscape and Melbourne's development at the time, particularly in the south-eastern suburbs".

Edgewater Towers features in the documentary "Ganz: How I Lost My Beetle". "Josef Ganz attempts to revolutionise society by partnering with Adolph Hitler to introduce the car to everyday people. As Hitler gains power, he turned on Ganz and threatens his life, forcing him to flee".

Edgewater Towers is included in the Guide to Historic St Kilda.

Edgewater Towers is the subject of the article "Sixty years of Melbourne's iconic first [high-rise] apartment building". "Revolutionary for its time, architect and former local councillor David Brand suggests the starkly, white, Modernist-style Edgewater Towers could probably only have happened in the cosmopolitan context of St Kilda". "which was always different from everywhere else in Melbourne".

Location 

Edgewater Towers is located at 12, Marine Parade (Beach Road), St Kilda between Marine Parade, Brooks Beach and Spenser Street, Peanut Farm Reserve. The stone wall running the length of Brooks Beach between Marina Reserve and Brookes Jetty is of the time of the original development and features prominently in the original sales advertising from 1960/61 and can be seen in Lyle Fowler's 1962 photo. The following are extracts from the original sales brochure which described Edgewater Towers as a "Location for better living".

"Relaxation at your door – The beach is at your West door, the park at your East door, and the romantic views of the bay are as lovely by night as they are by day. Nearby are – Swimming (Bathing Pavilion is now a restaurant), Beach, Lifesaving Club, Children's Playgrounds, Bowling Club (Now the Veg Out Community Gardens), Sports Oval, Parks and Yachting (Royal Melbourne Yacht Squadron)."

"Entertainment within 600 yards – You can enjoy outdoor living on either of your own two private patios, and a few yards away are – Palais de Danse, St Kilda, 3 min. (Now the site of a public car park); Earls Court Ballroom, 4 min. (Now the site of Public Housing accommodation for elderly people); Luna Park, Melbourne 2 min; South Pacific St Kilda Sea Baths, 4 min; Palais Picture Theatre, 3 min. (Now the Palais Theatre music venue); Victory Picture Theatre, 5 min. (Now the National Theatre, Melbourne a performing arts venue); St. Moritz Ice Rink, 5 min. (now the site of the St Moritz apartments, replacing the now demolished Novotel Hotel) and Health Studios".
"Shopping facilities only 200 yards – Besides your Kiosk and Restaurant on the premises nearby are – Coles store, Banks, Market, Chinese and European Restaurants, Post Office and Acland Street shopping".

"You're close to the cosmopolitan Hotels and Restaurants of Fitzroy Street, Melbourne and Acland St. – Close at hand are – Village Belle Hotel, 3 min; Beaconsfield Hotel, 8 min. (Now closed); Esplanade Hotel (Melbourne) 6 min. and Prince of Wales Hotel, 7 min."

"All Public Transport is within 200 yards – Edgewater Towers is the perfect location for living – City via St Kilda Road Tram; City via St Kilda railway station, bus and train (now the Melbourne tram route 96 light rail); Brighton by bus; Port Melbourne by bus; Elwood, Pt. Ormond by bus; Kew via Malvern and Hawthorn tram; Clifton Hill via Punt Road bus and Richmond via Chapel Street Tram".

"Only minutes in your car from Toorak, Victoria Road's smart 'Supper Strip'. The City lies a few minutes drive along St Kilda".

Bauhaus influence 
"For Benshemesh, it becomes apparent the influence that his time in Tel Aviv studying architecture had on his practice in Melbourne. Known for its extensive influence of the Bauhaus (the German Art School from 1919 to 1933 that combined crafts and fine arts and informed designers, architects, artists and craftspeople worldwide), Tel Aviv features over 4,000 modernist style buildings built between 1920 and 1940. Within the construction of these buildings was a new dynamic, that of urban densification unseen of at the time: over 4,000 people per square kilometer, which presented itself programmatic and social challenges. These challenges, such as the treatment of interstitial spaces such as the thresholds between public and private, began to manifest in the role of the balcony and vegetated space in the development of these apartment buildings. Here, we see that this social condition is carried over the antipodean environment Benshemesh ended up in. Whilst Benshemesh was known amongst friends and colleagues to have preferred working on high-rise constructions and not on private house commissions, this doesn't mean there wasn't still consideration of the end-user as an individual as opposed to a collective. It is for this reason that there was consternation in the Benshemesh camp about Edgewater Towers, perhaps his most note-worthy work, on the St Kilda shoreline, when residents starting enclosing their balconies with glazing, thus revising the connection of this threshold space with their neighbours, the environment, and the context".

American influence 
Robin Boyd's colourful take on Australian architecture and suburban life in 1960 "The Australian Ugliness" included a concept of American influence in Australia as "Austerica". "Austerica is on no map. It is, an Austerican advertisement would say, not a place but a way of life".

1960 advertising material described Edgewater Towers as:
"Melbourne's newest exclusive American inspired home unit project presents the most imaginative design with convenience, comfort and luxury of the largest home". "Manhattan living comes to Melbourne". "everything you'd find in a luxury Manhattan building is yours only minutes from Collins Street, Melbourne"

Philip Goad writes "this white, generously glazed slab seems more akin to 1950s Miami Beach, Florida, than New York City".

Edgewater Towers developer "Bruce Small visited Miami, USA, in 1958.....he studied the great land reclamation projects in which the area (Everglades) abounded. His imaginative mind was seized with the parallel that existed on Queensland's own Gold Coast – Land awaiting development at the hands of a bold and enterprising builder.....Bruce Small".

In November 1960 Bruce Small sold the Edgewater Towers project during construction to Nichols and Borrow Finance and Development Corporation Ltd. of Sydney. "Bruce Small.....had recently bought the property Questa on the corner of Robe St. and the Esplanade near Earls Court....plans are being prepared for an American-type motor-hotel (Motel) with 250 units estimated to cost £600,000. Bruce Small said his organisation hoped to get approval to build to 20 storeys in the case the lower floors would be used for car parking."

Taller 
Edgewater Towers is taller than Kinkabool, the first high-rise development (10 storeys, 1960) at Surfers Paradise, the forerunner of Gold Coast high-rise development. At the time Edgewater Towers was completed in 1961, the tallest residential building in Australia was Torbreck, Highgate Hill, Brisbane, 18 storey, completed 1960. Blues Point Tower, Sydney, 25 storey, completed in 1962, was then tallest residential building until 1970. The tallest building in Australia at the time was ICI House, 1 Nicholson Street, Melbourne, 20 storeys, completed in 1958 by Bates Smart McCutcheon. The AMP Building, 33 Alfred Street, Sydney, 26 storey, completed in 1962 was then tallest building until 1965.

The original Edgewater Towers sales brochure included photos of the surrounding views including "City View Overlooks Albert Park and Lake" with only the single tower of ICI House visible on the horizon. In Melbourne ICI House's tallest status was surpassed by the CRA Building, 89–101, Collins Street, 26 storey, completed 1962 by Sir Bernard Evans (architect). Today the 'City View'  is very different. List of tallest buildings in Melbourne.

The tallest building designed by Edgewater Towers' architect Mordechai Benshemesh was Nylex House, 10, Queens Rd. Melbourne, 20 storey including a stunning penthouse apartment completed 1971. Prior to Edgewater Towers his confirmed tallest buildings were just four storeys including next door at 11 Marine Parade, 'Bay View Marina', 41 flats, 1959. "There were several schemes for six and seven level apartment blocks in Chapel Street between Alma Road and Argyle Street, but only one, No. 16A, six storey block, was built. The designer is not known, however, one possible candidate is Mordechai Benshemesh, as he prepared plans for a similar, but unrealised scheme on an adjoining site (the plans for 16A Chapel Street have not been located)."

Robin Boyd's Domain Park Flats at 20 storeys and Sir Bernard Evans (architect)'s Emerald Hill Court, South Melbourne at 17 storeys for Housing Commission of Victoria, both taller than Edgewater Towers, completed in 1962. Emerald Hill Court, the "17 storey concrete tower represented the Housing Commission's first foray into high rise apartment construction. As such it marked the start of the Commission's ambitious and controversial high rise programme that transformed Melbourne's inner suburbs during the 1960s."

The Edgewater Towers' site planning requirement was minimum  open space per flat and the large "L" shaped site allowed Edgewater Towers to achieve , 13 storeys. Edgewater Towers' views cannot be built out by other tall(er) buildings because there is a planning height limit of 11m.

Beachfront development 

In May 1960 it was reported that "A great deal of interest has been created in this project, because it will obviously be the forerunner of a number of similar structures in the long-overdue redevelopment of Melbourne's inner suburban beach areas." Beachfront high rise developments around Hobsons Bay when viewed from Edgewater Towers’ rooftop terrace towards Port Melbourne include:

21, The Esplanade, St. Kilda, "Questa Heights", 10 storey, 29 flats, 1963, Mordechai Benshemesh architect and developer Bruce Small. Bruce Small's plans "for an American-type motor-hotel (Motel) with 250 units, estimated cost £600,000" and "to build to 20 storeys, in the case the lower floors would be used for car parking" were never realised.

13, The Esplanade, St. Kilda, "Bay View Heights", 10 storey, 33 flats, (twin high rise 3, Albert Square, 9 storey, 32 flats), 1969, Sol Sapir Architect and developer Nathan Beller. Constructed with high-compressive bricks without columns. Plans for an earlier 12 storey development of 35 flats at 13, The Esplanade by Roy Grounds, Frederick Romberg and Robin Boyd Architects with developer A. V. Jennings Construction Company were never realised. In March 1960 it was reported that both Edgewater Towers and the planned 12 storey "schemes will no doubt focus greater attention towards Melbourne's long neglected Bay front areas of St Kilda and South Melbourne".

11, The Esplanade, St Kilda, "Esplanade Apartments", 9 storey (plus two basement levels), 85 flats, 2007, Fender Katsalidis Architects and Becton Development. "Becton initially proposed a 38-storey development, but reluctantly scaled down its plans after more than 11,000 residents objected".

8–10, The Esplanade, St Kilda, "Arrandale", 15 storey, 41 flats, 1979, Sol Sapir Architect.

350, Beaconsfield Parade, St Kilda West, "Sunset Beach Tower", 12 storey (plus rooftop extension), 47 flats, 1969, Sol Sapir Architect and developer Nathan Beller.

333, Beaconsfield Parade, St Kilda West, "The Plaza 333", 16 storey, 51 flats, 1970, Sol Sapir Architect and developer Nathan Beller. Constructed with a cast concrete core formed using steel slip formwork and pre-cast concrete facade. Concrete floor slabs were jacked up into position.

325, Beaconsfield Parade, St Kilda West, "Breakwater Towers", 10 storey, 26 flats, 1975, Sol Sapir Architect.

313, Beaconsfield Parade, St Kilda West, "Belle Mer", 8 storey, 21 flats, 1968, Sol Sapir Architect.

225, Beaconsfield Parade, Middle Park, "Hobsons Bay Tower", 17 storey, 52 flats, 1980, Sol Sapir Architect and developer Nathan Beller.

195, Beaconsfield Parade, Middle Park, "Bayside Plaza", 10 storey, 36 flats, 1970, Sol Sapir Architect and developer Nathan Beller.

189, Beaconsfield Parade, Middle Park, "Miami Towers", 10 storey, 36 flats, 1970, Sol Sapir Architect and developer Nathan Beller.

85, Rouse Street, Port Melbourne, "HM@S Beach Apartments", Tower 2, 20 storey, 2001, Nonda Katsalidis Architect.

95, Rouse Street, Port Melbourne, "HM@S Beach Apartments", Tower 1, 20 storey, 2001, Nonda Katsalidis Architect.

107, Beach Street, Port Melbourne, Beacon Cove 1, 12 storey, 1997, 57 units, developer Mirvac.

115, Beach Street, Port Melbourne, Beacon Cove 2, 12 storey, 1998, developer Mirvac.

127, Beach Street, Port Melbourne, Beacon Cove 3, 14 storey, 2000, 63 units, developer Mirvac.

147, Beach Street, Port Melbourne, Beacon Cove 4, 14 storey, 2000, developer Mirvac.

155, Beach Street, Port Melbourne, Beacon Cove 5, 13 storey, 2005, developer Mirvac.

Building services 
Following is a description of Building services engineering at Edgewater Towers.

Fibre Internet for high speeds (installed 2018) by a private contractor (not NBN Co) with an optical fibre connection to each floor level and Category 6 cables taking the fibre connection to each flat.

Grade 1 water supply from Marine Parade and Spenser Street rises to rooftop tanks (one kitchen/potable and one bathroom/WC ‘Flushometers'’, tanks replaced 2007) under mains pressure with back-up duty/standby booster pumps. Level 11 and below served by gravity via vertical piping risers to each flat (one in kitchen and one in bathroom). A further tank is above the East lift roof serving only level 12 by gravity (retrofitted at the time the building opened to solve low water pressure in the penthouse flats). Each flat has two water isolation valves within kitchen and bathroom riser shafts. Vertical risers can be isolated at roof level. Hot water is via water heater (originally gas fired instantaneous) in kitchen with flue in façade. Hot water piping to bathroom is cast within the concrete floor slab from the kitchen. In ground incoming 50mm water main and 100mm fire main are copper from Spenser Street below car park asphalt (replaced 2013). 50mm water main from Marine Parade is copper (replaced 2013) and 100mm fire main is galvanized piping below the garden area. Water pipework within the building is copper.

Electrical substation is located at Spenser Street boundary supplying the Main Electrical room on Ground floor. Electrical Smart meters for Ground to level 3 flats are in the Main Switch Room. Electrical smart meters for flats on other levels are in Electrical cupboards on the upper levels (4, 5 & 6 on level 4; 7, 8 & 9 on level 7 and 10, 11 & 12 on level 10).

Vertical waste stacks in each flat (one in the kitchen and one in the bathroom) with a sewer connection to Spenser Street. Vertical stacks in the building are copper, cross-vented (i.e. Drain-waste-vent system) with smaller piping (expansion and contraction of the copper waste stacks in places work hardening the smaller piping connections which have required periodic repair).

Mechanical exhaust ventilation from bathrooms (24hr) via roof-mounted exhaust fans. (3 No. fans serving A & B flats; C, D, E & F flats and G & H flats. Duty fans replaced 2007). Redundant standby fans were removed and the remaining duty fans serving A & B and G & H flats were relocated into fire rated plantrooms for improved maintenance service life in 2016 to reduce noise nuisance on the accessible rooftop. Kitchen ventilation is via the façade.

Incoming gas supplies from Marine Parade run adjacent southern and northern boundary fences. Gas meters serving flats up to level 7 are mostly external adjacent boundary fences. Gas to water heater and stove is metered to each flat. Gas meters serving flats on level 8 and above are located in laundries and bike storage rooms on each upper level (flats A, B, C & D in West and flats E, F, G & H in East). Utility gas supply piping from Marine Parade site boundary to all gas meters replaced 2020.

Combined fire sprinkler/hydrant and hose reel system to AS2118.1, AS2118.6, AS2419 and BCA. Light hazard (residential sprinklers) and booster pump to AS2941 and BCA. Fire detection and alarm system to AS1670.1, AS1603, AS3000 and BCA. Occupant warning system to AS1670.4 and BCA. Smoke detectors replaced 2017.

The Main Distribution Frame (MDF) is at level 1 West (Ground Floor is Level 13).

Electronic security access control with colour video intercom (installed 2016) at Marine Parade, Spenser Street and entrance lobby. Electronic security to bike room and roof. Security intercom panel at level 1 West stair landing. CCTV coverage to car park, Ground floor and roof.

References

External links

Apartment buildings in Melbourne
Residential buildings completed in 1961
1961 establishments in Australia
St Kilda, Victoria
Buildings and structures in the City of Port Phillip